The 1973 Virginia Slims of Jacksonville, also known as the Jacksonville Invitational,  was a women's tennis tournament played on outdoor clay courts at the Deerwood Club  in Jacksonville, Florida in the United States that was part of the 1973 Virginia Slims World Championship Series. It was the second and last edition of the tournament and was held from April 16 through April 22, 1973. First-seeded Margaret Court won the singles title and earned $6,000 first-prize money.

Finals

Singles
 Margaret Court defeated  Rosie Casals 5–7, 6–3, 6–1

Doubles
 Rosie Casals /  Billie Jean King defeated  Françoise Dürr /  Betty Stöve 7–6, 5–7, 6–3

Prize money

References

Virginia Slims of Jacksonville
1973 in sports in Florida
April 1973 sports events in the United States